Onida Electronics (formerly Mirc Electronics) is an Indian multinational electronics and home appliances manufacturing company, based in Mumbai. Onida became well known in India for its colour CRT televisions and smart TVs. Other appliances manufactured by the company include flat panel TVs (LED, LCD TVs), air conditioners, washing machines, microwave ovens, DVD home theatre systems, mobile phones, projector systems and LED lights.

History

Onida was started by G.L. Mirchandani and Vijay Mansukhani in 1981 in Mumbai. G.L. Mirchandani is the chairman and managing director of M/s Mirc Electronics Ltd. In 1982, Onida started assembling television sets at their factory in Andheri, Mumbai. It was established as "Mirc Electronics" in 1981. Since then, Onida has evolved into a multi-product company in the consumer durables and appliances sector. Onida achieved a 100% growth in ACs and microwave ovens and a 40% growth in washing machines last year.

Onida came out with the famous caption Neighbour's Envy, Owner's Pride. The popular theme of the ads was a devil complete with horns and tail in the 1980s.

Onida has a network of 33 branch offices, 208 Customer Relation Centers and 41 depots spread across India. As on 31 March 2005, Onida had a market capitalization of  3,014.6 million.

Mirc Electronics won an "Award for Excellence in Electronics" in 1999, from the Ministry of Information Technology, Government of India. Onida with its Sales & Marketing office in Dubai reported a 215% export growth in two years, setting the base for an increased robust international presence.

The shipments to Arab states of the Persian Gulf contribute almost 65% of Onida's export revenue, while shipments to the fast-growing East African market (Uganda, Tanzania, Kenya and Ethiopia) and the SAARC countries accounted for 16% of export revenues. In addition to countries in the Persian Gulf, Onida has a presence in Russia, Ukraine and neighboring CIS countries. Apart from television exports to Russia, Onida also exports DVD players and high-end LCD televisions.

Products

Onida brand has following range of products:

 LCD TVs
 Plasma TVs
 smart TVs
 Televisions
 DVD and Home theater systems
 Air conditioners
 Washing machines
 Microwave ovens
 LoudSpeaker
 Mobile phones
 LED TVs
 LCD monitor
 Webcam

See also
List of electronics brands

References

7. LED TV Manufacturers ( Feltron Industries Pvt Ltd )

External links 

Consumer electronics brands
Home appliance manufacturers of India
Manufacturing companies based in Mumbai
Electronics companies of India
Mobile phone manufacturers
Electronics companies established in 1981
Indian brands
Indian companies established in 1981
1981 establishments in Maharashtra
Companies listed on the National Stock Exchange of India
Companies listed on the Bombay Stock Exchange